1890 was the 104th season of cricket in England since the foundation of Marylebone Cricket Club (MCC) and the first in which the County Championship was held as an official competition, following agreement between MCC and the leading county clubs at a meeting in December 1889. Surrey became the first official county champions after winning nine out of fourteen games.

In Test cricket, England, captained by W. G. Grace, defeated Australia in a three-match series by 2–0 to win The Ashes. It was the 13th Test series between the sides. William Gunn of Nottinghamshire was the season's highest run-scorer (1,621); George Lohmann of Surrey took the most wickets (220).

Honours
 County Championship – Surrey
 Wisden (Five Great Wicket-Keepers) – Jack Blackham, Gregor MacGregor, Dick Pilling, Mordecai Sherwin, Henry Wood

Ashes tour 

England won the three-match Test series 2–0. Only two matches were completed as one was abandoned due to persistent heavy rain:

 1st Test at Lord's Cricket Ground – England won by 7 wickets
 2nd Test at The Oval – England won by 2 wickets 
 3rd Test at Old Trafford Cricket Ground – abandoned without a ball being bowled (rain)

County Championship

Overall first-class statistics

Leading batsmen

Leading bowlers

References

Bibliography

External links
 Cricket in England in 1890
 1890 County Championship at CricketArchive

1890 in English cricket
County Championship seasons
English cricket seasons in the 19th century